Pooppathy is a small village in Poyya panchayath near Mala in the Thrissur district of Kerala, India. Madathikkavu Bhagavathi temple is in Pooppathy.

Location

Temples
There are a lot of temples in Pooppathy such as Thankulam siva kshethram, Chulloor vishnu kshethram, Madathikkavu bhagavathi kshetram, Daivathingal, Chundanga parammbil annapoorneswary kshethram, choolakkal bhagavathy kshethram, Erimmal Sri Annapoorneswari Bhagavathy Kshethram, Tharakkal bhagavathy kshethram and Durga Kshetram  which have a history of years.

Education 

The major school in this region is ALPS primary school at Pooppathy. It is aided school having a track record of more than 100 years, it was founded by late Shri. K.R.Karappan, KaimaparambilHouse Pooppathy.  There are two libraries at Pooppathy (North and South)  (pooppthy comes under poyya panchayath) which played an important role in its history.

Festivals
The local festivals are connected with a temple, church, a national phenomenon. The festivals are cultural events which bring together people from all walks of life, all castes and creeds. These are perhaps the only occasions when one gets to watch the wealth of classical and folkarts of the land which are otherwise fast being relegated to memory. In this the most important one is Madathikavu Bhagavathys utsavam which is celebrated on Makaram 7th and 8th of every year (in January). The festival with an unmatched pageantry of drums, 3 caparisoned elephants and brilliant fireworks are so inseparably integrated that the extravaganza of Utsavam, excites you in the same breath when you hear the name of Pooppathy. Besides the major utsavam, the temple has a unique distinction of hosting Utsavams of two backward communities with equal fervency. 'Desavilakku Utsavam'is celebrated in great enthusiasm. The 'Soyustar 

Soccer Fest' is a major event which was revived in the recent past by Football frenzy people and give unmatched enthusiasm to the every category of locals.

Economy
The socio-economic factors of Pooppathy is just like that of a very self-sufficient economy. The place is very rich of labour force and have a short fall of sufficient number of factories or other production area to utilise the force in a good way. A considerable portion of its people are in government service. There is a group of dedicated youth who are organizing Competitive Exam Oriented Coaching Class. The coaching & Career Guidance is being given absolutely free with support of Poyya Grama Panchayath.

References

Villages in Thrissur district